William Ickham (died 1424), of Canterbury, Kent, was an English politician.

Family
Ickham was the son of Thomas Ickham, also an MP for Canterbury. Ickham was married to Margaret, the widow of Hugh Holyngbroke. They had no children, leading to lengthy legal wranglings after his death.

Career
Ickham was a Member of Parliament for Canterbury, Kent in 1411, October 1416 and 1420.

References

Year of birth missing
1424 deaths
14th-century births
English MPs 1411
People from Canterbury
English MPs October 1416
English MPs 1420